Parishville is the primary hamlet and a census-designated place (CDP) in the town of Parishville in St. Lawrence County, New York, United States. As of the 2010 census, it had a population of 647, out of 2,153 in the entire town of Parishville.

The community is in eastern St. Lawrence County, on the eastern side of the town of Parishville. The eastern edge of the CDP is the town border with Hopkinton. New York State Route 72 runs through Parishville, leading northeast  to State Route 11B in Hopkinton and northwest  to Potsdam.

The West Branch of the St. Regis River passes through the community, dropping over a dam in the center of the village and falling  in elevation in less than one mile as it continues to Allen Falls Reservoir downstream. The West Branch joins the St. Regis River at Winthrop and is part of the St. Lawrence River watershed.

Demographics

References 

Census-designated places in St. Lawrence County, New York
Census-designated places in New York (state)